Bilecik is a city in northwestern Anatolia, Turkey. It is the seat of Bilecik Province and Bilecik District. Its population is 74,457 (2021). The mayor is Melek Mızrak Subaşı (CHP).

The town is famous for its numerous restored Turkish houses. It is increasingly becoming more attractive to tourists. With its rich architectural heritage, Bilecik is a member of the European Association of Historic Towns and Regions.  southeast from Bilecik is Söğüt, a small town, where the Ottoman Empire was founded in 1299.

History 
From 1867 until 1922, Bilecik was part of Hüdavendigâr vilayet.

Geography 
Bilecik is located in the Southern Marmara section of the Marmara Region. It is one of the least populated provincial capitals in Turkey. Bilecik consists of the quarters Pelitözü, Aşağıköy, Osmangazi, Orhangazi, Cumhuriyet, Gazipaşa, Ismetpaşa, Istasyon, Istiklal, Beşiktaş, Hürriyet, Bahcelievler and Ertuğrulgazi.

Climate 
Bilecik has a hot summer Mediterranean climate (Köppen climate classification: Csa), or a temperate oceanic climate (Trewartha climate classification: Do), with cool, wet and often snowy winters, and hot and dry summers. Summers are hot and dry with temperatures exceeding  during the peak of summer which are the driest months. Winters are cold and it frequently snows between the months of December and March.

References

External links

 
 cultura.gov.tr
 Pictures of the town and the Edebali lodge

Populated places in Bilecik District
Towns in Turkey